The Windsor Lancers are the varsity athletic teams that represent the University of Windsor in Windsor, Ontario, Canada. The school's varsity program supports 9 different sports. Their mascot is a lancer and the team's colours are blue and gold. The varsity teams compete in the Ontario University Athletics provincial conference and the national U Sports organization. The school joined the Ontario-Quebec Athletic Association (now known as the OUA) in 1952.

The university offers 8 sports for women and 9 sports for men. Additionally, there are 2 sports clubs offered: men's baseball and women's fastpitch.

As of the 2015–16 season, the Lancers have won 33 national titles and 87 provincial titles. From 2010 to 2016, the Lancers have won more national championships than any other Canadian university.

Since 1990, the Windsor Lancers track and field teams have done well provincially and nationally, with the men's team winning 23 OUA titles and 9 national titles and the women's team winning 17 OUA titles and 11 national titles respectively.

Varsity teams
The Windsor Lancers participate in the following varsity sports:
Basketball (men's and women's teams)
Cross country (men's and women's teams)
Curling (men's and women's teams)
Football (men's team)
Golf (men's and women's teams)
Ice hockey (men's and women's teams)
Soccer (men's and women's teams)
Track and field (men's and women's teams)
Volleyball (men's and women's teams)

Windsor Lancers football

The Windsor Lancers football team began competing in the Central Canada Intercollegiate Football Conference in 1968, and have continued play uninterrupted since then. The team plays on Alumni Field out of University of Windsor Stadium located on the campus grounds at the University of Windsor. The program is notable for featuring three Hec Crighton Trophy winners, most recently being former Canadian Football League running back, Daryl Stephenson, when he won the award in 2006. The Hec Crighton Trophy was also claimed by Andrew Parici in 1972, becoming just the second quarterback to win the award, and Scott Mallender, also at quarterback, in 1979. The football team itself has won a Yates Cup championship in 1975.

Ice hockey

Windsor Lancers men's hockey

History
The Windsor Lancers men's hockey team began in the early 1960s as members of the Ontario Intercollegiate Athletics Association (as the Assumption College Lancers). The Lancers won their division in 1965, but lost the OIAA final to Laurentian University in a sudden-death 4–2 loss. In 1968, the Lancers were promoted to the QOAA. In 1971, the QOAA was dissolved and the Lancers joined the newly formed Ontario University Athletics Association, now known as the OUA.

The Windsor Lancers men's hockey team is currently led by Head Coach Kevin Hamlin. Coach Hamlin has led the Lancers to tremendous success including the 2013–14 OUA Queen's Cup Championship and two straight CIS national championship tournament appearances.

In 2008–09, Hamlin's first season, he was named the OUA Men's Hockey Coach of the Year after leading the Lancers to a 15-point turnaround in the standings from the previous year. In 2010–11, Hamlin's Lancers finished the regular season with a 12–12–4 record as he led Windsor back into the playoffs for the second straight season. His second year behind the Lancer bench came in 2009–10 where led the Lancers back to the playoffs as they advanced to the OUA West Semi-Finals. In 2011–12, he led the Lancers to their best season in over a decade as they finished 15–12–1 and advanced the Western Conference finals. Coach Hamlin's squad finished the year ranked #11 in the country. In 2012–13, Coach Hamlin's squad finished 18–9–1 and in second place in the OUA Western conference. The Lancers finished as one of the top scoring teams in the nation including 8th in Canada in goals and 6th in the CIS in power-play goals.

In 2013–14, Coach Hamlin led his squad to the Queen's Cup Ontario Championship for only the second time in school history. They also finished the season ranked #5 in Canada – the program's highest ever finish in the national rankings. Hamlin was honoured with both the Windsor Essex Sports (WESPY) Coach of the Year award and the Gino Fracas Coach of the Year award for his outstanding work behind the bench.

En route to winning the Queen's Cup, the Lancers enjoyed a tremendous playoff run that included playoff series wins over Toronto, Western, Lakehead and McGill to earn the title. At the CIS National Championship tournament, Windsor also earned their first ever victory at Nationals as they knocked off the A.U.S. champion Acadia Axemen 4–2 in pool play.

In 2014–15, Hamlin was named the Ontario University Men's Hockey Coach of the Year for the second time in his career and was a finalist for the CIS National Coach of the Year after leading the Lancers to a program best 22–4–1 record and first place overall in the OUA. The Lancers were ranked in the CIS top ten for 17 straight weeks and captured an Ontario bronze medal while earning their second consecutive trip to the CIS national championships. Individually, the team received tremendous recognition for their outstanding season. Senior forward Spencer Pommells, a native of Grande Prairie, Alta., became the first Lancer to claim the Joseph A. Sullivan Trophy as CIS player of the year and only the third Windsor player to capture a CIS major award in men's hockey. Forwards Chris Gignac (1999) and Ken Minello (1989) had previously merited the R.W. Pugh Award presented annually to the most sportsmanlike player. The senior forward racked up 50 points in 27 league games, including 16 goals and a CIS-leading 34 assists, to win the national scoring race by eight points and the OUA crown by 11. Of his team-leading 16 goals, five were game-winners, leaving him one short of the nation's lead. Kenny Bradford was named the OUA Defenseman of the year and a CIS All-Canadian after he led the CIS in scoring by a defenceman with 28 points, scoring eight goals and adding 20 assists. He was a key cog in the Lancers third-ranked power play, scoring six of his eight goals on the man advantage. Senior netminder Parker Van Buskirk was named the OUA goaltender of the year after he led the conference with 20 wins and made the second most starts of any goaltender with 24. His 2.86 goals against average was the second-best of any western conference goalie, and his .904 save percentage was sixth best overall. Dylan Denomme was named the OUA West rookie of the year as he finished second on the Lancers in points with 31, scoring 13 goals and 18 assists, while appearing in all 27 games. He led all CIS rookies in scoring and tied Bradford for the team lead with six power play goals as well.

Season-by-season standings

Women's hockey

Basketball

Women's

The Windsor Lancers women's basketball program is led by Head Coach Chantal Vallée, a native of Montreal, has become one of the top women's basketball programs in the country, having capturing five straight CIS national titles in 2011, 2012, 2013, 2014, and 2015.

In 2008–09, Vallée and the Lancers made history as she led her team to a 21–1 record, their first ever OUA Provincial Championship title and a trip to the CIS National Championships in Saskatchewan, where they finished fourth. In 2010–11, the Lancers won their first ever CIS National Championship title in the program's 50th year. With a 20–2 regular season record, the Lancers were ranked in the top two in the CIS Top Ten all year long and claimed their third straight OUA Provincial Championship. At Nationals, her Lancer squad defeated the Quebec champion Laval Rouge et Or, the AUS champion Cape Breton Capers and the Canada West champion Saskatchewan Huskies to claim the CIS National Championship. With the win, the Lancers became the first host school to ever win a CIS national championship title in women's basketball at home and were also the first team outside of the Canada West Conference to win the Bronze Baby Trophy in the last 19 years.

In 2011–12, Coach Vallée and the Lancer women's basketball team captured their second straight CIS national title with a 69–53 over the second seeded UBC Thunderbirds. Ranked fourth heading into the national tournament, the Lancers defended their 2011 title by defeating AUS champion Acadia in the quarter-final, host Calgary in the semi, and the Canada West winner Thunderbirds to take the Bronze Baby back to Windsor.

In 2012–13, Vallée's squad made program history as they completed an undefeated regular season with a 21–0 record and the No. 1 ranking in Canada. It was the first time in OUA women's basketball history that a team has gone undefeated since moving away from the 12-game schedule and placed first overall in the OUA west division for the fourth consecutive year. In the playoffs, Windsor became only the fourth team in CIS women's basketball history to capture three straight CIS national titles. Coach Vallée's Lancer squad held off Carleton to win their fourth provincial title in five years, and capped off their undefeated season at the national championships with a convincing win over the host Regina Rams in the gold medal game.

In 2013–14, Coach Vallée led her team to an incredible fourth straight CIS national championship title, winning at home for the second time in four years. The Lancers finished the regular season with a sparkling 21–1 record and the No. 1 ranking in Canada. After capturing their fifth OUA title in six seasons, the Lancers knocked off Laurier, Fraser Valley and Saint Mary's to capture the prestigious Bronze Baby trophy as national champions for the fourth consecutive year.

In 2014–15, the Lancers won a historic fifth straight CIS national championship. They finished with an impressive 19–1 conference record and their sixth OUA title in the past seven seasons. Ranked #1 heading into nationals, the Lancers knocked off Laval, Saskatchewan, and McGill to make history and claim their fifth consecutive Bronze Baby trophy as national champions, becoming only the second team in CIS history to do so. The Lancers extended their CIS post-season win streak to 21–0 and Chantal Vallee was honoured as the CIS women's basketball coach of the year for the second consecutive season.

In March 2020, Lancers basketball alumnae Jessica Clemencon, Miah-Marie Langlois and Korissa Williams were named to the list of the Top 100 U Sports Women’s Basketball Players of the Century (2011-2020).

Windsor Lancers track and field
The Lancers are the most successful track and field program in Canadian Inter-University Sport history.

Led by head coach Dennis Fairall, the Lancers have captured 25 Canadian university cross country and track and field championships (20 track and field, 5 cross country), in addition to the 46 Ontario University championships (39 track and field, 7 cross country).

In his 29 seasons at the helm of the program, Coach Fairall has been honoured 65 times as either the CIS national coach of the year or the OUA Provincial Coach of the Year in Track and Field and Cross Country.

As of 2015–16, the Lancers have won 23 of the past 25 OUA provincial championships in men's track and field, and 17 of the past 25 OUA provincial championships in women's track and field.

The Lancer track and field program has featured a number of high-profile athletes over the years including national standouts O'Brian Gibbons, Andrea Steen, Mike Nolan, Ryan McKenzie and most recently Melissa Bishop.  Bishop, who is still coached by Dennis Fairall, won a gold medal at the 2015 Pan Am Games in Toronto, Ontario.  She also set a new Canadian record in the 800 metres in the summer of 2015 while also capturing a silver medal at the 2015 IAAF World Championships in Beijing, China.

Awards and honors

Athletes of the Year
This is an incomplete list

National awards
 Jessica Clemencon, Basketball, 2011 BLG Awards
 Korissa Williams, Basketball, 2015 BLG Awards

Gallery

References

External links